Hotel Beautifool is an upcoming Bollywood film starring Rejith Menon, Johnny Lever, Brijendra Kala,  Imam Siddique. Its director is Sameer Iqbal Patel.

Development
Hotel Beautifool is based on the popular Hindi play Baat Baat mein Bigdey haalaat, written and directed by Sameer Iqbal Patel. Sameer was planning to make it into a film for some time when Mohammed Aslam Shaikh and Madhire Ravinder Reddy saw the play and decided to join with Patel in making it into a Hindi feature film.

Filming
The first schedule of the film started at Mumbai's future studio on 20 July 2014 and completed on 29 July. The second schedule started on 27 September 2014 in Morjim, Goa,  and completed on 15 October. The film is due for release in 2017.

In an interview with the press Johnny Lever revealed about his character in the film, who is a sardar and has a problem with red colour which brings about madness and humor in the film.

Music

The theme song of the film was recorded in Kolkatta in Usha Uthup's voice at her recording studio. The title song of Hotel Beautifool was recorded in Shaan's voice. A party song, "mann samunder gehra gehre", was recorded  for the film with Bhoomi Trivedi. The remix of "mann samundar" and "mann ka kauwa" was done by DJ Sachin and DJ Harshit Shah

Cast

Rejith Menon as Akhileshwar Muthulingum
Brijendra Kala as Pedro Kumar Alias P.K
Johnny Lever as Harry Singh
Imam Siddique as Inspector
Jia Sharma as Mili
Sagarika Chhetri as Jaanu Lee
Sandeep Gosh as Toughy
Subha Rajput as Kamini
Anuja Walhe as Tanvi
Manoj Santoshi as D K
Istiyak Khan as Sharpshooter Romeo
Rohit Khurana as Nawab

References

2017 comedy films
2010s Hindi-language films
Unreleased Hindi-language films